Ice Hockey Northern Ireland, abbreviated to IHNI, is responsible for the administration of all ice hockey in Northern Ireland, and was set up in early 2011.

The body consists of 5 teams, Belfast Ice Foxes, Northern Ireland Tridents, Northern Ireland Prowlers, Belfast Spitfires and the Castlereagh Spartans.

IHNI runs an in-house round robin style tournament for both a Winter and Summer Cup, consisting of 6 games per team in the 'League period', to set your place for 'Playoff' semi-finals in the format of 1st vs 4th and 2nd vs 3rd.

The winners of the semi-finals go on to play in the Final.

References  

Ice hockey governing bodies in the United Kingdom
Ice Hockey
Ice hockey governing bodies in Europe
Ice hockey in Northern Ireland
Sports organizations established in 2011